Alexander Nemerov (born 1963) is an American art historian. He is the Carl and Marilyn Thoma Provostial Professor in the Arts and Humanities at Stanford University. He specializes in American art dating from the nineteenth and twentieth centuries.

Career
Nemerov received his bachelor's degree in English from the University of Vermont in 1985. He graduated cum laude and as a member of Phi Beta Kappa. He then continued on to Yale University, where he received two degrees in art history: a master's in 1987 and a PhD in 1992. Nemerov wrote a dissertation on Frederic Remington, under the supervision of Jules Prown.

After receiving his doctorate, Nemerov began his teaching career at Stanford University as Assistant Professor of Art History. He was promoted to full Professor in 2000, and a year later, moved to his alma mater Yale to become the Vincent J. Scully Professor of the History of Art. In 2012, Nemerov transferred back to become the Carl and Marilyn Thoma Provostial Professor in the Arts and Humanities.

In 2017, Nemerov gave the annual A. W. Mellon Lectures in the Fine Arts at the National Gallery of Art. His talk was titled "The Forest: America in the 1830s." 

Throughout his career, Nemerov has focused primarily on the study of American art dating from the nineteenth and twentieth centuries in a variety of media. He has published on artists such as Wilson Bentley, Helen Frankenthaler, Lewis Hine, Jasper Johns, Deana Lawson, Raphaelle Peale, John Quidor, Clifford Ross, and Remington (the subject of his doctoral dissertation). Additionally, he has worked to organize exhibitions on artists such as William Rush at the Wistar Institute (2002) and Remington at the Norman Rockwell Museum (2006).

Personal life
Nemerov is the son of the poet Howard Nemerov, who was the grandson of the businessman Frank Russek. Howard's sister is the photographer Diane Arbus, who married the actor Allan Arbus. Their children are the photographer Amy Arbus and the writer Doon Arbus.

Awards
 Smithsonian Institution Material Culture Fellowship, National Museum of American Art (1989-1991)
 Stanford University Dean's Award (1998-1999)
 Stanford University Internal Faculty Fellowship, Stanford Humanities Center (1998-1999)
 The Stanford Daily Top-Ten Professors (2014) 
 National Gallery of Art A. W. Mellon Lectures in the Fine Arts (2017)

Works

Frederic Remington and Turn-of-the-Century America, 1995 
The Body of Raphaelle Peale: Still Life and Selfhood, 1812-1824, 2001 
Icons of Grief: Val Lewton’s Home Front Pictures, 2005 
Soulmaker: The Times of Lewis Hine, 2016

References

External links
Stanford University profile

1963 births
Living people
People from Bennington, Vermont
Russek family
21st-century American Jews
American art historians
American people of Russian-Jewish descent
Jewish American historians
University of Vermont alumni
Yale University alumni
Stanford University Department of Art and Art History faculty
Yale Faculty of Arts and Sciences